The Quebec Contemporary Music Society, or Société de musique contemporaine du Québec in French (SMCQ), is a contemporary classical-music organization based in Montreal, Quebec. It was founded in 1966 by Montreal composers and musicians, including Wilfrid Pelletier, Jean Papineau-Couture, Hugh Davidson, Serge Garant, and Maryvonne Kendergian.

The SMCQ presents an annual series of concerts involving its own ensemble as well as invited guests, the  biennial Montreal/New Music International Festival, and a youth program called SMCQ Jeunesse (SMCQ Youth). The 2007–08 season marked the inaugural of an Homage Series, planned to be a biennial collaborative event featuring the music of an important Quebec composer, which that season was Claude Vivier. The SMCQ's artistic director since 1988 has been Walter Boudreau.

Artistic Directors
1966-1986 : Serge Garant
1986-1988 : Gilles Tremblay
1988-... : Walter Boudreau

Montreal/New Music International Festival

The first Montreal/New Music International Festival was produced in 2005 and featured the music of more than 50 composers, including Cornelis de Bondt, R. Murray Schafer, and Michel Longtin. It included performances by the Hilliard Ensemble, Klangforum Wein and the Orchestre Symphonique de Montréal. The format of the festival included a week of concerts, lectures, master classes, and public rehearsals with composers.

External links
Official site
Official site of Montreal/New Music International Festival (alternate domain name)

Quebec music
Music organizations based in Canada
Classical music festivals in Canada
Contemporary music organizations
1966 establishments in Quebec
Recurring events established in 1966